"Carrickfergus" is a 44-line poem by Louis MacNeice. It was written in 1937 and first published in book form in MacNeice's poetry collection The Earth Compels (1938). The poem reflects on MacNeice's childhood in Carrickfergus, a large town in County Antrim, Northern Ireland. Although the title of the poem is "Carrickfergus", the text of the poem refers to "Carrick", as the town is known locally and colloquially.

Background
Louis MacNeice was born in 1907 in Belfast, as he notes in the opening lines of "Carrickfergus":

'Gantries' refers to the Harland and Wolff shipyard, and the Arrol Gantry which dominated the skyline. The 'mountain' is the Black Mountain, which forms a backdrop to inland Belfast.

In November 1907 MacNeice's father, John MacNeice, was appointed Rector of St Nicholas' Church, Carrickfergus, and in January 1909 the family moved to Carrickfergus, a town ten miles from Belfast on the northern shore of Belfast Lough:

The MacNeices lived first in a house at 5 Governor's Walk, facing the harbour. "Its front door opened on the street, the farther side of which was flanked by the harbour wall, so that in rough weather spray would lash the windows. The rector liked its closeness to the sea as well as to the historic castle (a stone's throw to the left) and to his church." In early 1911 the MacNeices moved into Carrickfergus Rectory, a large house with a garden, "far from the dirt and noise of the harbour, on the other side of town." Here Louis MacNeice spent his childhood until, at the age of ten, he began at Sherborne Preparatory School, Dorset:

In "Carrickfergus", MacNeice reflects on his childhood growing up in Carrickfergus. One stanza describes his position as the son of John MacNeice – "I was the rector's son, born to the anglican order" – and mentions the Chichester Monument, an elaborate marble monument in St Nicholas' Church which made a deep impression on the young Louis MacNeice. He would later include a description of the Chichester Monument in his unfinished autobiography, The Strings are False: "a huge Elizabethan monument to the Chichester family who had then been the power in the land." "Carrickfergus" also describes a wartime childhood, with rationing and "maps above the fireplace", and a "huge camp of soldiers" in sight of Carrickfergus Rectory.

Structure
"Carrickfergus" is a poem of eleven stanzas, each of four lines. The second and fourth lines of each stanza rhyme. (The sixth stanza has the same word, "long", at the end of the second and fourth line.) MacNeice makes use of poetic devices such as assonance – "the clang of trams" – and alliteration – "sweat and khaki in the Carlisle train". The poem is autobiographical, and is narrated in the first person by Louis MacNeice: "I was born in Belfast... I was the rector's son... I went to school in Dorset..."

Notes

Carrickfergus
Poem